The following lists events that happened during 1874 in Chile.

Incumbents
President of Chile: Federico Errázuriz Zañartu

Events

February
15 February - The Hospital of San Carlos (Chile) is founded.

Births
20 March - Alberto Cabero (d. 1955)
25 May - Abraham Oyanedel (d. 1954)
25 November - Alberto Edwards (d. 1932)

Deaths
24 May - Pedro Félix Vicuña (b. 1805)

References 

 
Years of the 19th century in Chile
Chile